Ben Cottreau (born April 4, 1985) is a Canadian former professional ice hockey player. He played college hockey at Mercyhurst University.

After ending his college career, Cottreau leaped to the professional ranks, signing a contract with the Albany River Rats of the American Hockey League on March 20, 2008.

Cottreau spent the 2008-09 season with the Landshut Cannibals of the DEL2. He later signed with the Hannover Scorpions of the Deutsche Eishockey Liga (DEL) on June 8, 2009. On February 16, 2010, Cottreau signed a two-year contract extension with the Scorpions. However, he retired from professional hockey on May 12, 2011 due to various head injuries suffered during his playing career.

Awards and honours

References

External links

1985 births
Living people
Albany River Rats players
Canadian ice hockey forwards
Hannover Scorpions players
Ice hockey people from Toronto
Canadian expatriate ice hockey players in Germany
Mercyhurst Lakers men's ice hockey players